Wzonka-Lad is a Nintendo Game Boy emulator for the Amiga series of home computers.

History
Wzonka-Lad was written by Ville Helin in 68020 assembler.

The reason why Wzonka-Lad came to be was Virtual Game Boy (VGB), a Game Boy emulator written in C ported to Amiga. It ran so slowly on Amiga hardware that Helin decided to write one faster in assembly language.

The emulator requires at least a 68020 processor, provides several options to vary game speed and colours and supports graphics and sound cards (via CyberGraphX and AHI).

In comparison to other Game Boy emulators for Amiga, version 0.64 was slower and more compatible than AmigaGameBoy, but faster than Unix ports like VGB. Version 0.99 was able to achieve playable speed for most games on systems with a 68030 50 MHz processor or higher.

In August 2003, Wzonka-Lad dropped its shareware status, and was released as free software under the GPL-2.0-only license.

References

External links
Wzonka-Lad homepage

Amiga emulation software
Game Boy emulators
Shareware
Assembly language software
Free video game console emulators